Theater Na de Dam is an annual theatre manifestation in the Netherlands. It takes place on the night of the Remembrance of the Dead memorial service that takes place May 4, on Dam Square. In over eighty different theatres throughout the Netherlands, theatre performances with a substantive link to the Second World War are being performed simultaneously.

Founding and theme 
In 2010, well known Dutch theatre makers Jaïr Stranders and Bo Tarenskeen worried about the decreasing eloquence of the Remembrance of the Dead memorial service. According to them, the distance  between the current generations and the Second World War was not only increasing, they also felt that the character of the annual ceremony had become too general and abstract. They felt that it threatened to make it impossible to properly reflect on the specific history of the Second World War.

By programming and producing multiple different performances that relate to the Second World War in a personal and contemporary manner, the initiative strives to make its audience reflect critically on the events during that time and how it still influences the world of today. It strives to ask the question if it is possible to learn from history.

The first edition took place in 2010, when seven performances in and around de Nes (the theatre district of Amsterdam) took place. Since then, the initiative has grown immensely and currently offers over eighty performances around the Netherlands.

Annual events in the Netherlands
Theatre in the Netherlands
Spring (season) events in the Netherlands